177 Huntington (formerly the Christian Science Administration Building) is a  Brutalist skyscraper located in the Christian Science Center in the Fenway neighborhood of Boston, Massachusetts. The building, opened in 1973, originally served as the Christian Science world headquarters. In 2012, it was leased by Beacon Capital Partners, undergoing renovations soon after. Current tenants include Northeastern University, as well as consulting and investment companies. In 2017, four peregrine falcons hatched in one of the building ledges.

References 

Skyscrapers in Boston
1970s architecture in the United States
Christian Science in Massachusetts
Landmarks in Fenway–Kenmore
Brutalist architecture in Massachusetts
Buildings and structures completed in 1972
1972 establishments in Massachusetts